Neverending Nightmares is a video game developed by Infinitap Games. It is a horror game drawing inspiration from the lead designer Matt Gilgenbach's personal struggles with obsessive–compulsive disorder and depression; in an interview, he stated that he was "trying to create that feeling [of bleakness and hopelessness] in Neverending Nightmares".

Gameplay 
The player takes the role of Thomas, a man who "wakes up" from one nightmare and into another. As the player navigates Thomas throughout the game, the nightmares become progressively worse, including the horrifying monsters that lurk within them. Each time Thomas dies in a nightmare, comes across some serious cause of depression, or commits self-harm, he will "wake up" again in either the same nightmare as before, or into a different one. This acts as the game's checkpoint and save system. The game contains a total of three different endings, all influenced by the player's choices or paths that they take.

The game features a 2D hand-drawn line art style heavily influenced by the works of Edward Gorey. It uses a minimalist user interface, forgoing onscreen prompts and loading screens during play in order to increase immersion.

Plot

Setting and characters
Neverending Nightmares revolves around Thomas Smith, a young man who is suffering from a seemingly-endless string of nightmares (hence the title). Another character, Gabby, is introduced as Thomas' little sister, and frequently appears in his nightmares, occasionally changing roles. At turning points in the game, Thomas finds Gabby dead in various situations; Thomas himself also dies in his nightmares, sometimes by his own hand, though this only leads him to wake up in yet another nightmare.

Throughout the game, which is implied to be set in the late 1800s, Thomas must explore various locations in his nightmares. These include a mansion, a cemetery, an insane asylum, a forest, and a hospital.

Story

The game begins with Thomas "waking up" from a nightmare, in which he had stabbed his younger sister Gabby in the stomach. As he wanders through each nightmare, "waking up" in a bed each time, the player sees Thomas commit gruesome acts of self-harm out of depression, such as pulling a blood vessel or even a bone out of his arm.

Depending on the player's actions, Thomas will finally wake up into one of three different endings.
 Wayward Dreamer: after waking up, a young Thomas goes to Gabby's room, where he kisses his sleeping sister good-night.
 Destroyed Dreams: after escaping a nightmarish version of himself, Thomas slowly awakens in a hospital, his arms bandaged and bloody. Gabby, either as his sister or wife, begs him to wake up, and rejoices when he finally does.
 The Final Descent: an adult Thomas wakes up at his desk, where he reads a letter from Gabrielle, his wife. After the loss of their daughter, Gabrielle was forced to leave Thomas, as he couldn't get over the tragedy. After reading the letter, Thomas quietly weeps in his chair. A portrait on the wall implies that the girl murdered at the beginning was his daughter, not Gabrielle.

Development 

In September 2013, a Kickstarter campaign for the game's development was successfully funded, raising $106,722 of its original $99,000 goal.  The game was released on Steam and Ouya on September 26, 2014.

Reception

Pre-release 
Neverending Nightmares received largely positive buzz during the course of its development. Adam Sessler said it was "very, very interesting" after playing an early build at the Penny Arcade Expo. He compared it to Gone Home in how it told a story personally relevant to its creator. IGN included it on a list of its most anticipated horror games for 2014, emphasizing its "wonderfully-distinct, pen-and-ink style." It was nominated by The Escapist as one of the best games of E3 2014.

Post-release 

The game for PC received a score of 68/100 at Metacritic indicating "mixed or average reviews". Smangaliso Simelane praised the game's "spooky soundtrack composed of twinkling piano notes and ominous synthetic whines." Giant Bomb nominated it for Best-Looking Game and Best Horror Game of 2014.

Sales

In April 2015, it was reported that Neverending Nightmares had sold around 22,000 copies across all platforms, and that it had generated around $250,000 in revenue.

See also
Retro/Grade, the previous game by Gilgenbach and McGlothlin

References

External links

Developer's website

2014 video games
Android (operating system) games
Crowdfunded video games
Video games about death
Dolls in fiction
Fiction about fatherhood
Horror video games
IOS games
Linux games
MacOS games
Monochrome video games
Kickstarter-funded video games
Obsessive–compulsive disorder in fiction
Ouya games
PlayStation 4 games
PlayStation Vita games
Fiction about suicide
Video games about mental health
Video games about nightmares
Video games developed in the United States
Video games set in psychiatric hospitals
Video games with alternate endings
Windows games